Bellis annua subsp. microcephala is a species of daisy in the genus Bellis and is a subspecies of Bellis annua. It is endemic to parts of western Europe and north Africa.

References

annua subsp. microcephala
Plants described in 1879
Flora of Spain
Flora of Tunisia
Flora of Portugal
Flora of Algeria
Flora of Morocco
Flora of Libya